The Rice Owls women's basketball team represents Rice University in women's basketball. The school competes in Conference USA in Division I of the National Collegiate Athletic Association (NCAA). The Owls play home basketball games at Tudor Fieldhouse in Houston, Texas.

History
They played in the Southwest Conference from 1982 to 1995 and the Western Athletic Conference from 1996 to 2004 before joining Conference USA in 2005. As of the end of the 2020–21 season, they have a 659–601 all-time record. They were champions of the Women's Basketball Invitational in 2017. They were champions of the Women's National Invitation Tournament in 2021.

NCAA tournament results

References

External links